Lugones may refer to:

Lugones (surname)
Lugones, Siero, a parish in Siero, Asturias, Spain
Lugones, Santiago del Estero, a municipality and village in Santiago del Estero Province, Argentina